Proscription is, in current usage, a 'decree of condemnation to death or banishment' (Oxford English Dictionary) and can be used in a political context to refer to state-approved murder or banishment. The term originated in Ancient Rome, where it included public identification and official condemnation of declared enemies of the state and it often involved confiscation of property. 

Its usage has been significantly widened to describe governmental and political sanctions of varying severity on individuals and classes of people who have fallen into disfavor, from the en masse suppression of adherents of unorthodox ideologies to the suppression of political rivals or personal enemies. In addition to its recurrences during the various phases of the Roman Republic, it has become a standard term to label: 
 The suppression of Royalists after Oliver Cromwell's decisive defeat of Charles II at the Battle of Worcester in 1651 (see image)
 The curbing of Western religion in early 18th-century China<ref>[https://books.google.com/books?isbn=0295984309 Thomas H. Reilly, 2004, The Taiping Heavenly Kingdom: Rebellion and the Blasphemy of Empire"", Seattle, WA, University of Washington Press, p. 43ff, 14ff, 150ff], accessed 18 April 2015</ref> 
 The banning of Highland dress following the Jacobite rising of 1745 in Scotland 
 Atrocities that occurred during the Reign of Terror (1793-1794) phase of the French Revolution
 The mass deportations of British and French workers from Russia in the mid-19th century, with the onset of the Crimean War 
 In the 20th century, such things as the efforts of the Labour Party in the United  Kingdom to prevent "Communist entryism" through blacklisting propagandizing persons and organisations 
 The broad prohibitions of Jewish cultural institutions and activities in the Soviet Union after the birth of the state of Israel in 1948 and the onset of the 1948 Arab–Israeli War
 The banning of organisations considered terrorist—including the membership of and support for—in Ireland, particularly the Provisional IRA and the INLA in the 1970s.

 Ancient Rome 

 Origin 
Proscriptions (Latin proscriptio, plural proscriptiones) initially meant public advertisements or notices signifying property or goods for sale.

During the dictatorial reign of Sulla, the word took on a more sinister meaning. In 82 or 81 BC, Sulla instituted the process of proscription in order to avenge the massacres of Gaius Marius and his son. He instituted a notice for the sale of confiscated property belonging to those declared public enemies of the state (some modern historians estimate about 520 people were proscribed as opposed to the ancient estimate of 4,700 people) and therefore condemned to death those proscribed, called proscripti in Latin.

 Treason 
There were multiple reasons why the ancient Roman government may have desired to proscribe or attribute multiple other forms of pain. One of the most prevalent reasons for punishment are treason crimes, also known as lex maiestatis. Treason crimes consisted of a very broad and large number of regulations, and such crimes had a negative effect on the government. This list includes, but is not limited to: assisting an enemy in any way, Crimen Laesae Majestasis, acts of subversion and usurpation, offense against the peace of the state, offenses against the administration of justice, and violating absolute duties. Overall, crimes in which the state, emperor, the state's tranquility, or offenses against the good of the people would be considered treason, and, therefore, would constitute proscription. Some of these regulations are understandable and comparable to safety laws today. Others, like violating absolute duties, could very easily be accidents or circumstantial crises that would deserve punishment regardless.

Punishments for treason were quite harsh and were meant to highlight the seriousness and shamefulness of the treason crimes committed. There were a variety of punishments for capital crimes, including death, loss of a freedman's status, loss of citizenship with a loss of family rights, and a loss of family rights only. Death was a very common punishment and was referred to as summum supplicium, or the "extreme penalty". The death sentence was often the punishment for all but the mildest forms of treason. Julius Caesar was an influential framer of the law on treason. The Interdiction from Water and Fire was a civil excommunication resulting in ultimate exile, which included forfeiture of citizenship and forfeiture of property. Those who were condemned would be deported to an island. Emperor Augustus frequently utilized this method of exile, as he desired to keep banished men from banding together in large groups. Such punishment was given for only the mildest forms of treason, in comparison to the death penalty, which served for most other treason crimes. Augustus also created the prefect, whose powers included the ability to banish, deport, or send to the mines. The prefect also heard appeals.

 Sulla, 82 BC 
An early instance of mass proscription took place in 82 BC, when Lucius Cornelius Sulla was appointed dictator rei publicae constituendae ("Dictator for the Reconstitution of the Republic"). Sulla proceeded to have the Senate draw up a list of those he considered enemies of the state and published the list in the Roman Forum. Any man whose name appeared on the list was ipso facto stripped of his citizenship and excluded from all protection under law; reward money was given to any informer who gave information leading to the death of a proscribed man, and any person who killed a proscribed man was entitled to keep part of his estate (the remainder went to the state). No person could inherit money or property from proscribed men. Many victims of proscription were decapitated and their heads were displayed on spears in the Forum.

Sulla used proscription to restore the depleted Roman Treasury (Aerarium), which had been drained by costly civil and foreign wars in the preceding decade, and to eliminate enemies (both real and potential) of his reformed state and constitutions; the plutocratic knights of the Ordo Equester were particularly hard-hit. Giving the procedure a particularly sinister character in the public eye was the fact that many of the proscribed men, escorted from their homes at night by groups of men all named "Lucius Cornelius", never appeared again. (These men were all Sulla's freedmen.) This gave rise to a general fear of being taken from one's home at night as a consequence of any outwardly seditious behaviour.

Sulla's proscription was bureaucratically overseen, and the names of informers and those who profited from killing proscribed men were entered into the public record. Because Roman law could criminalise acts ex post facto, many informers and profiteers were later prosecuted.

The proscription of 82 BC was overseen by Sulla's freedman steward Lucius Cornelius Chrysogonus, and was rife with corruption.

The proscription lists created by Sulla led to mass terror in Rome. During this time, "the cities of Italy became theaters of execution." Citizens were terrified to find their names on the lists. Those whose names were listed were ultimately sentenced to death. The executions were brutal and consisted of beheading. Often, the heads were then put on display for the city to see. The bodies of the condemned were often mutilated and dragged before being thrown into the Tiber River. Additionally, those who were condemned lost rights even after their brutal death. Those killed were denied the right to a funeral, and all of their possessions were auctioned off, often to the ones who killed them. Negative consequences arose for anyone that chose to assist those on the list, despite not being listed on the proscribed lists themselves. Anyone who was found guilty of assisting the condemned was capitally punished.

Families were also punished as a result of being related to one of the proscribed. It was forbidden to mourn the death of a proscribed person. According to Plutarch, the greatest injustice of all the consequences was stripping the rights of their children and grandchildren. While those proscribed and their loved ones faced harsh consequences, the people who assisted the government by killing any person on the proscription list were actually rewarded.

43 BC
The proscription of 43 BC was the second major proscription. It began with an agreement in November 43 between the triumvirs Octavian Caesar, Marcus Antonius, and Marcus Lepidus after two long meetings. Their aim was to avenge Julius Caesar’s assassination, eliminate political enemies, and acquire their properties. The proscription was aimed at Julius Caesar’s conspirators, such as Brutus and Cassius, and other individuals who had taken part in the civil war, including wealthy people, senators, knights, and republicans such as Sextus Pompey and Cicero. There were 2,000 names on the list in total, and a handsome reward of 2,500 drachmae for bringing back the head of a free person on the list (a slave's head was worth 1,000 drachmae); the same rewards were given to anyone who gave information on where someone on the list was hiding. Anyone who tried to save people on the list was added to the list. The material belongings of the dead victims were to be confiscated. Some of the listed were stripped of their property but protected from death by their relatives in the Triumvirate (e.g., Lucius Julius Caesar and Lepidus' brother Paullus). Most were killed, in some cases gruesomely. Cicero, his younger brother Quintus Tullius Cicero (one of Julius Caesar's legates) and Marcus Favonius were all killed in the proscription. Cicero's head and hands were famously cut off and fastened to the Rostra.

Contemporary Roman historians provide conflicting reports as to which triumvir was most responsible for the proscriptions and killing.  They agree that enacting the proscriptions was a means by all three factions to eliminate political enemies. Marcus Velleius Paterculus asserted that Octavian tried to avoid proscribing officials whereas Lepidus and Antony were to blame for initiating them. Cassius Dio defended Octavian as trying to spare as many as possible, whereas Antony and Lepidus, being older and involved in politics longer, had many more enemies to deal with.

This claim was rejected by Appian, who maintained that Octavian shared an equal interest with Lepidus and Antony in eradicating his enemies. Suetonius said that Octavian was reluctant to proscribe officials, but did pursue his enemies with more vigor than the other triumvirs. Plutarch described the proscriptions as a ruthless and cutthroat swapping of friends and family among Antony, Lepidus, and Octavian. For example, Octavian allowed the proscription of his ally Cicero, Antony the proscription of his maternal uncle Lucius Julius Caesar, and Lepidus his brother, although only Cicero would ultimately be killed as a result of these concessions.

 See also 
 Attainder
 Damnatio memoriae
 Enemy of the people
 Homo sacer
 Hostis humani generis
 Ostracism
 Outlaw
 Purge
 Targeted killing

 References 

 Further reading 
 Michnik, Adam, and Elzbieta Matynia. "The Ultras of Moral Revolution." Daedalus 136, no. 1 (2007): 67–83. https://www.jstor.org/stable/20028090 
 Mousourakis, George. A Legal History of Rome. London: Routledge, 2007.
 Plutarch, The Life of Sulla.
 Ridley, Ronald T. "The Dictator's Mistake: Caesar's Escape from Sulla." Historia: Zeitschrift für Alte Geschichte Bd. 49, H. 2 (2nd Qtr., 2000), pp. 211-229 
 Robinson, O.F. Penal Practice and Penal Policy in Ancient Rome''. Routledge, 2007.

Political and cultural purges
Roman law